Kolven Island is a small island lying  east of Stedet Island and just northeast of Falla Bluff, in Utstikkar Bay, Mac. Robertson Land, Antarctica. It was mapped by Norwegian cartographers from air photos taken by the Lars Christensen Expedition, 1936–37, and named Kolven (the club).

See also 
 List of Antarctic and sub-Antarctic islands

References

Islands of Mac. Robertson Land